Rev. Jan Pitass (3 July 1844 in Piekary Śląskie - 11 December 1913 in Buffalo) was a Polish priest who was the founder and first pastor of the oldest Polish parish (St. Stanislaus - Bishop & Martyr Church) in the diocese of Buffalo, New York. He was a graduate of Niagara University before moving to Buffalo.

He has been described a "leading figure" in the Polish-American community of his time.

References

External links
 History of Stanislaus Church in Buffalo

Polish Roman Catholic priests
American Roman Catholic priests
1913 deaths
1844 births
Niagara University alumni
Polish emigrants to the United States
People from Piekary Śląskie